Billy Pearson (1921-2009) was an Irish footballer, who played as a winger in the Football League for Grimsby Town and Chester.

References

Chester City F.C. players
Grimsby Town F.C. players
Association football wingers
English Football League players
1921 births
2009 deaths
People from Clonmel
Republic of Ireland association footballers